Galicianism is a regionalist political movement in Galicia.

Origins
The concept of Galicianism first appeared in the mid-nineteenth century. At that time in history it was initially known as "provincialism". Soon it was referred to as regionalism. This was a reaction to the increased centralization of the Spanish State (following the French model of nation state) which attempted to eradicate internal administrative, and to some point cultural, differences within the country.

The term Galicianism as such was coined after the establishment of the Irmandades da Fala (Brotherhoods of the Galician Language), in 1916, and the apparition of modern Galician nationalism. The Irmandades da Fala was an organization hosting members from both the lower-middle-class and intellectuals. This organization was led by Antón Vilar Ponte. Within the next decade (1920s), this organization was strengthened by two groups: the nationalists, led by the Partido Galeguista (Galicianist Party) of Castelao, and the federalist republicans of ORGA. ORGA was directed by Santiago Casares and Antón Vilar.

Republic and Civil War
In 1931, with the coming of the Spanish Second Republic, a number of drafts for a Statute of Autonomy were prepared by the Galicianists. The final version was approved in December 1932 at the Municipal Assembly of the Galician capital, Santiago de Compostela. The Statute of Autonomy was approved by referendum on 28 June 1936, and later ratified by the Spanish Parliament in 1937. However, the Spanish Civil War and the subsequent dictatorship put an end to the prospect of autonomy. At the end of the war (1939) many Galicianists were either executed or had to leave for exile.

Galicianism during the dictatorship (1939–75)
The foundation of the Editorial Galaxia in 1950, publishing house promoting Galician culture and Galician language, was a visible act of resistance. Clandestine organizations supporting the cause of Marxism (as an opposition to the dictator) flourished in the 1950s and 1960s following the example of Editorial Galaxia and taking advantage of a timid relaxation of the dictatorial regime. Those new organizations and movements openly labelled themselves as nationalist, seeing themselves as the natural heirs of the early Galicianists (for example the Galician People's Union (UPG) was founded by some old Galicianists among other new members). All those organizations would claim Alfonso Daniel Rodríguez Castelao's classic work, Sempre en Galiza (1944), as the ideological cornerstone for Galician contemporary nationalism and even for their own foundational principles.

Contemporary Galicianism
With the end of the dictatorship in 1975 and the passing of a new constitution in 1978, Galicianism was further strengthened up to the point that today the vast majority of political forces in Galicia call themselves Galicianist, whether they are nationalist or not, left wing or right wing.

For example, unlike in other Spanish autonomous communities, the conservative People's Party of Galicia includes Galicianism (seen as strong regionalism) as one of its ideological principles. Even the Spanish Socialist Workers' Party has a strong regional flavour in Galicia, not to mention the actual main Galician nationalist party, the Galician Nationalist Bloc (BNG). A possible explanation for this is that Galician identity is so embedded in Galicians that any political party willing to participate in elections must at least show some degree of interest in the promotion of Galicianism, but it may range greatly, from moderate regionalism to outright claims for independence.

See also
Galician nationalism
Partido Galeguista (1931)
A.D.R. Castelao
Nationalities in Spain
Galician Statute of Autonomy (1936)
Galician Statute of Autonomy (1981)
Irmandades da Fala

References

Bibliography
 Beramendi, J. and Núñez Seixas, X.M. (1996): O nacionalismo galego, A Nosa Terra, Vigo
 Fernández Baz, M.A., (2003): A formación do nacionalismo galego contemporáneo (1963-1984), Laiovento
 Núñez Seixas, X.M.(1993): Historiographical approaches to nationalism in Spain, Saarbrücken,  Breitenbach
 Rodríguez Polo, X.R. (2009): O triunfo do galeguismo. Opinión pública, partidos políticos e comportamento electoral na transición autonómica. Madrid: Editorial Dykinson.
 Rodríguez Polo, X.R. (2009): Ramón Piñeiro e a estratexia do galeguismo. Vigo: Xerais.

History of Galicia (Spain)
Political ideologies
Galician nationalism